Manuel de Sarratea, (Buenos Aires, 11 August 1774 – Limoges, France, 21 September 1849), was an Argentine diplomat, politician and soldier. He was the son of Martin de Sarratea (1743–1813), of the richest merchant of Buenos-Aires and Tomasa Josefa de Altolaguirre. His sister Martina de Sarrateas (1772–1805) married Santiago de Liniers, vice-roy del Rio de la Plata.

First Triumvirate
 
Sarratea was educated in Madrid. He returned to the country to work as a diplomat. He participated in the May Revolution of 1810 and per advice from Belgrano he was named ambassador in Río de Janeiro. When the Primera Junta was dissolved, he returned and took part on the following government body, the so-called First Triumvirate. One of the Triumvirate's political accomplishments was a treaty signed with viceroy Francisco Javier de Elío, where the Banda Oriental (present-day Uruguay was ceded to the crown.

In 1812, after the change of government in Montevideo, the treaty was broken and the war against the royalists in the city was resumed. Most of the Criollo soldiers had abandoned the territory, following their caudillo, José Artigas. Sarratea took charge of the army in the Banda Oriental, making his primary mission to get back the troops from Artigas. He attempted to convince him and when this failed he attempted to bribe him, also without success. He then declared Artigas a traitor but this measure was rejected by the rest of the Triumvirate.

The Triumvirate was dominated by minister Rivadavia, until its fall in October 1812. Sarratea continued to be in charge of the Banda Oriental army until the first part of the following year, when he was replaced by José Rondeau. Only when the ex-Triumvir Sarratea left, did Artigas and his men return to the siege of Montevideo.

Sarratea remained inactive for more than two years, until Director Gervasio Posadas sent him on a diplomatic mission to Madrid and London. Arriving in Spain he offered the recently restored king, Ferdinand VII, the submission of the United Provinces to the Spanish crown under a certain autonomy. Instead he was treated as the representative of a group of rebels and had to leave and go to England.

Buenos Aires Governor
Sarratea returned to Buenos Aires in mid-1816, and was named government minister of foreign relations for the Supreme Director, Juan Martín de Pueyrredón. He later resigned for health reasons and made contacts within the porteño political opposition, so he was expelled and exiled to Montevideo by order of the same Director.

After the battle of Cepeda he joined the federalist army commanded by Estanislao López and Francisco Ramírez. They then sent him as their representative to the Buenos Aires Cabildo, whom he convinced to name him provincial governor. He assumed the governorship on 18 February 1820, and soon after he signed the Treay of Pilar with the federalist chiefs, through which the Buenos Aires Province agreed to be recognized as equal to the other United Provinces.

AS one of the secret clauses of the treaty, he promised the delivery of armament to the federalist caudillos. When the Buenos Aires military found he was to deliver armament, they raised against him, and deposed him on 6 March, replacing him with general Balcarce. He lasted only one week as governor, when general Ramírez threatened with attacking the city if they did not deliver the promised armament.

Sarratea assumed government again on 11 May, and also gave Ramírez some military units under the command of colonel Mansilla. Sarratea could not contain the permanent state of anarchy in the province, nor gain the obedience and trust of the military, so he was forced to resign at the end of May.

He joined Ramírez's army in his campaign against Artigas, and defeating him was probably his greatest personal success. Later on he took part in the preparations for the war Ramirez would fight against Buenos Aires, Santa Fé and Córdoba, which ended in disaster. Sarratea then recused himself from politics for a time.

Diplomatic missions
On 31 August 1825, Juan Gregorio de Las Heras, named Sarratea as Encargado de Negocios de las Provincias Unidas del Río de la Plata cerca de Gran Bretaña (Commercial representative of the United Provinces of the River Plate to Great Britain).

President Rivadavia sent him in 1826 to be the United Provinces representative in London again. There he supported the British policy of separating the Banda Oriental from the rest of the provinces, which was accomplished in 1828. Governor Manuel Dorrego kept him as ambassador, and Juan Manuel de Rosas later named him ambassador to Brazil and France.

External links 
 Decreto del mombramiento como Encargado de Negocios en 1825.

1774 births
1849 deaths
Members of Argentine triumvirates
People from Buenos Aires
Governors of Buenos Aires Province